MetroWest is a master-planned community in Orlando, a city located in the central portion of the U.S. state of Florida.  The  mixed-use community is located southwest of downtown Orlando, with the main entrance situated on MetroWest Boulevard, off of Kirkman Road.

The neighborhood was developed in the 1980s by Debra, Inc., an Orlando-based developer, as a business, commercial and residential community- a place where people can live, work and play.  It has over 9,600 residential homes as of 2013 (see Residential neighborhoods below).  Housing options in the diverse community of Metrowest include a range of single-family homes with several apartment, townhome and condominium complexes spread over the gently rolling landscape.

MetroWest is managed by the MetroWest Master Association (MWMA), a corporation formed by Debra, Inc., which has the overall responsibility and right in maintaining the standards of all common areas located within the community.  Past and future developments, projects and changes in MetroWest are first approved by the association's Design Review Board (DRB) following guidelines for quality and architecture that is harmonious to the present structures and topography.  The beautiful award-winning landscaping and clean environment keep MetroWest at the top of the City of Orlando's most beautiful places to live in.

Geography

The  mixed-use community is located in western Orlando.  It is bounded by Kirkman Road to the east; by Turkey Lake to the southeast; by Pembrooke Pines development to the south; by the Florida's Turnpike to the southwest; Apopka-Vineland Road on its western tip; and to the north by Steer Lake Road, Edgewood Children's Ranch, Lake Hiawassee and Orlo Vista, Florida.

Bisecting the middle of the development, winding from north to south, is South Hiawassee Road, which also serves as the main entrance coming from the north and only entrance from the south. The other north entry point is through Lake Vilma Drive, off of Steer Lake Road. There are several entrances on the eastern side of the community, from north to south: Westgate Dr; Raleigh St; the north and south Valencia Community College Dr; north and south Metropolis Way; MetroWest Blvd, the main entrance of the community; and Arnold Palmer Drive.

After five years and an estimated $50 million worth of preparation, tracts of land were sold to developers and builders for residential and business projects. The Metrowest Master Association (MWMA) was established by Debra, Inc. on February 17, 1986, and thereafter, all construction and design plans are first examined by the Design Review Board (DRB) of the MWMA following strict guidelines before approval. The original master plan for the community included up to 4,500 residential units; 6 million square feet of office space, 2.5 million square feet of retail, restaurant, and industrial space; and 3,700 hotel rooms. Like other master-planned communities, the development was designed as a place where people can live, work and play. The  urban center, where dense development was planned, lies south of MetroWest Blvd and extends to Turkey Lake.

Work on the Metrowest Golf clubhouse was started in 1986. It was opened and dedicated the following year. The course was first managed by the Arnold Palmer Golf Management. Residential development near the community's 18-hole golf course was started in 1987. By 1989, about 700 single-family homes or villas have been built or planned. Another 1,300 apartment units had been built or were on the drawing boards. Development was also started on the community's most exclusive residential area, Palma Vista, a planned 200-lot subdivision that surrounds the 13th and 14th holes of the golf course on the highest land in the community. The community's first shopping center, MetroWest Village at the corner of S. Hiawassee Rd and Westpointe Blvd, was opened in the fall of 1990 completely leased.

Residential neighborhoods

Homes
There are nine subdivisions with single-family homes and one townhome complex in Metrowest with a total 1,259 residential units.

Condominiums

Fourteen condominium complexes with over 4,851 residential units.  Some of these dwellings were previous apartments converted into condominiums during the housing boom.

Apartments

Ten complexes with a total of 3,557 units make up the apartments in MetroWest.

Others
Golf Ridge is a 59-unit condominium complex off of S. Hiawassee Rd. near Raleigh St. that is completely surrounded, but not part of MetroWest.

Education

Schools located within Metrowest
MetroWest Elementary School is a public school on Lake Vilma Rd. that was opened in 1986 to serve the children of the community from PK to Grade 5.
Valencia College West Campus, along Kirkman Rd, was awarded as the top community college of the nation in 2011 by the Aspen Institute College Excellence Program.

Middle school
Students who live west of South Hiawassee Drive are zoned to attend Gotha Middle School on Gotha Road in Windermere, Florida.  Students east of South Hiawassee Drive go to Chain of Lakes Middle School on Conroy-Windermere Road in also in Windermere.

High school
High school students living in MetroWest are zoned to Olympia High School on Apopka-Vineland Road in Orlando, which opened in August 2001.

Awards
Winner of the Orlando's City Beautiful Award for District 6 in 2012 for its well-kept, aesthetically pleasing grounds, and litter-free environment.
Metrowest is the statewide winner for the 2013 Safety and Security Award from the Florida Communities of Excellence awarded on April 5, 2013.

References

External links
Metrowest Golf Club Official Website

Neighborhoods in Orlando, Florida
Geography of Orlando, Florida
Planned communities in Florida